St. Marks is an unincorporated community in Sedgwick County, Kansas, United States. As of the 2020 census, the population of the community and nearby areas was 124.

History
The community is based around the St. Mark Catholic Church that was built in c.1903-1906.

Demographics

For statistical purposes, the United States Census Bureau has defined St. Marks as a census-designated place (CDP).

Education
The community is served by Renwick USD 267 public school district.  St. Marks School (K-8) is located in St. Marks at 19001 W. 29th St. N.

References

Further reading

External links
 Sedgwick County maps: Current, Historic, KDOT

Unincorporated communities in Sedgwick County, Kansas
Unincorporated communities in Kansas
Census-designated places in Sedgwick County, Kansas
Census-designated places in Kansas